Changé may refer to the following places in France:

 Changé, Mayenne, a commune in the Mayenne department
 Changé, Sarthe, a commune in the Sarthe department

See also 
 Changey, a commune in the Haute-Marne department
 Change (disambiguation)